Haji Sk. Nurul Islam is an Indian politician and an MLA from  All India Trinamool Congress in West Bengal.  He was born in 1964 in Bahera, West Bengal, India.He was a small-time zari businessman and resident of Chhoto Jagulia village in Barasat.

MP Local Area Development Scheme (2009-10)
Amount Released Rs. 2,00,00,000.00
Total Recommended Works 51
Expenditure Rs. 97,00,000.00
Total Sanctioned Works 16
Completed Works 16

Under the MPLAD scheme, each MP may identify projects and sanction up to Rs 2 crore per year for development works in their respective constituencies. From 2011,the amount has been increased to Rs 5.

Deganga riot
Islam was accused of being involved in the 2010 Deganga riots. The BJP demanded the arrest of Haji Nurul Islam for instigating the mob into a communal frenzy. A F.I.R. had been filed against him.

References

Trinamool Congress politicians from West Bengal
Indian Muslims
Living people
India MPs 2009–2014
Lok Sabha members from West Bengal
1963 births
People from Basirhat
Indian National Congress politicians from West Bengal